Magari is a village in Kanepi Parish, Põlva County in southeastern Estonia. It's located about 4.5 km southeast of Kanepi, the administrative centre of the municipality, neighbouring the Erastvere, Põlgaste, Soodoma and Lauri villages. As of 2011 Census, the village's population was 57.

On , during the Great Northern War, the Battle of Erastfer took place in Magari. The Russian troops with 18,800 men took the victory over the Swedish 2,470 men. It was the first significant Russian victory in the Great Northern War.

The Ahja River passes Magari on its northern border with Lauri village.

References

Villages in Põlva County